Pylyp Vyacheslavovych Budkivskyi (born 10 March 1992) is a Ukrainian professional footballer who plays as a striker for Polissya Zhytomyr.

In Russian media and some Ukrainian (Sport Arena) he is also mentioned by Russian variation of his name as Filip.

Career
From 2011 he played for FC Illichivets Mariupol on loan and in May 2012 he signed a 2-year contract with them to play in the Ukrainian Premier League.

Anzhi Makhachkala 
In the 2017–18 transfer window he returned from a loan at Kortrijk and was sent on loan to Anzhi Makhachkala in the Russian Premier League.

Sochaux 
In 2018 he was sent to Sochaux in France on loan.

Zorya Luhansk 
In the winter window transfers he moved from Shakhtar Donetsk to Zorya Luhansk signed a contract of 2.5 years

Desna Chernihiv 
In 2020 he moved to Desna Chernihiv.> He scored his first goal for the side against Shakhtar Donetsk in July.

On 19 July, he scored against Zorya Luhansk and helped his team qualify for the 2020–21 Europa League third qualifying round for the first time in the club's history.

On 22 August Budkivskyi scored a goal in a 3–1 victory against Zorya Luhansk in the first match of the 2020–21 Ukrainian Premier League season.

On 7 November he scored the winning goal against FC Mynai at Obolon Arena in Kyiv.

On 1 August 2021 he opened his account for the 2021–22 Ukrainian Premier League season against FC Mariupol. On 22 December, Budkivskyi became a free agent.

Polissya Zhytomyr
In January 2022, he signed a contract for one and a half years with Polissya Zhytomyr in the Ukrainian First League. On 28 August he scored two goals away against Prykarpattia Ivano-Frankivsk, opening his account for the 2022–23 season.

International career
He played for the Ukraine under-21 side, earning 23 caps and scoring 18 goals. In 2014, he made his senior debut for Ukraine.

Personal life
In March 2022, during the Siege of Chernihiv, Budkivskyi, together with other former Desna players raised money for the civilian population of the city of Chernihiv.

Career statistics

Club

Honours
Zorya Luhansk
Ukrainian Cup runner-up: 2015–16

Individual
 Ukraine U21 Top scorer: 18 goals

Gallery

References

External links
 Profile on Official FC Desna Chernihiv website
 Profile on Official Shakhtar website

 Instagram

Living people
1992 births
Footballers from Kyiv
FC Shakhtar Donetsk players
FC Mariupol players
FC Sevastopol players
FC Zorya Luhansk players
FC Desna Chernihiv players
FC Polissya Zhytomyr players
Ukrainian footballers
Ukrainian Premier League players
Association football forwards
Ukraine international footballers
UEFA Euro 2016 players
FC Anzhi Makhachkala players
K.V. Kortrijk players
Ukrainian expatriate footballers
Expatriate footballers in Russia
Ukrainian expatriate sportspeople in Russia
Expatriate footballers in Belgium
Ukrainian expatriate sportspeople in Belgium
Russian Premier League players
FC Sochaux-Montbéliard players
Expatriate footballers in France
Ukrainian expatriate sportspeople in France